James Ford (born 29 September 1982) is an English professional rugby league coach who was the head coach of the York City Knights in Betfred Championship, and a former player. 

Ford signed initially for the  Featherstone Rovers as a youth in 1998, before moving on to the Sheffield Eagles, and then Castleford in 2008. Ford made his first-grade début whilst playing for the Castleford Tigers in Super League in a 28–6 win away to the Warrington Wolves in 2009's Super League XIV, and he went on to make a total of eight appearances, scoring once. In late 2009, he left the club for Widnes. During his playing and early coaching career, he was a lecturer at Wakefield College.

After retiring as a player in 2014, Ford took over as head coach at York, and became the club's first ever full-time coach in 2018. In November 2021, he extended his contract with the club until the end of 2024.  In October 2022 Ford resigned from York to become assistant coach at Super League club Wakefield Trinity.

References

1982 births
Living people
Castleford Tigers players
English rugby league coaches
English rugby league players
Featherstone Rovers players
Place of birth missing (living people)
Rugby league centres
Rugby league fullbacks
Rugby league wingers
Sheffield Eagles players
Widnes Vikings players
York City Knights coaches
York City Knights players